PK-86 Nowshera-IV is a constituency for the Khyber Pakhtunkhwa Assembly of the Khyber Pakhtunkhwa province of Pakistan.

See also
 PK-85 Nowshera-III
 PK-87 Nowshera-V

References

External links 
 Election Commission of Pakistan's official website

Khyber Pakhtunkhwa Assembly constituencies